Ready, Willing, and Able is a 1937 musical film directed by Ray Enright and starring Ruby Keeler and Ross Alexander.

Songs in the film were written by composer Richard A. Whiting and lyricist Johnny Mercer. The most successful song introduced by Wini Shaw and Ross Alexander, and reprised throughout, was "Too Marvelous for Words", which has become a pop and jazz standard.

In the final production number choreographed by Bobby Connolly, Ruby Keeler and Lee Dixon tap across the keys of a giant-sized typewriter while dancers’ legs mimic typebars striking letters.  The film was released to lackluster business in the aftermath of Alexander’s suicide.

Cast 
 Ruby Keeler as Jane Clarke
 Lee Dixon as Pinky 'Pinkie' Blair
 Allen Jenkins as J. 'Katsy' Van Courtland
 Louise Fazenda as Clara Heineman
 Ross Alexander as Barry Granville (his last film before his suicide)
 Carol Hughes as Angie
 Hugh O'Connell as Truman Hardy
 Wini Shaw as The English Jane Clarke
 Teddy Hart as Yip Nolan
 Addison Richards as Edward 'Mac' McNeil
 E.E. Clive as Sir Buffington 
 Jane Wyman as Receptionist
 Lillian Kemble-Cooper as Mrs. Buffington
 unbilled players include Beatrice Hagen, Virginia Dabney, And Milton Kibbee

External links
  
 
 
 New York Times review

1937 films
1937 musical comedy films
1937 romantic comedy films
American musical comedy films
American romantic comedy films
American romantic musical films
American black-and-white films
1930s English-language films
Films directed by Ray Enright
Films set in New York City
Warner Bros. films
Films produced by Samuel Bischoff
1930s romantic musical films
1930s American films